A partial lunar eclipse took place on Tuesday, June 3, 1947. A tiny bite out of the Moon may have been visible at maximum, though just 2.02% of the Moon was shadowed in a partial eclipse which lasted for 34 minutes and 42 seconds. A shading across the moon from the Earth's penumbral shadow should have been visible at maximum eclipse.

Visibility

Related lunar eclipses

Lunar year series

Saros cycle

Tritos series 
 Preceded: Lunar eclipse of July 4, 1936
 Followed: Lunar eclipse of May 3, 1958

Tzolkinex 
 Preceded: Lunar eclipse of April 22, 1940
 Followed: Lunar eclipse of July 16, 1954

See also
List of lunar eclipses
List of 20th-century lunar eclipses

Notes

External links

1947-06
1947 in science